Delfín Jebución Jaranilla (December 24, 1883 – June 4, 1980) was a Filipino judge. He served as the Attorney General of the Philippines from 1927 to 1932, as part of the American colonial Insular Government. He was named Judge Advocate General and after the Japanese conquest of the Philippines was forced on the Bataan Death March.
He served as Secretary of Justice, Agriculture, and Commerce in 1945. After holding the position of Secretary of Justice, he was appointed the 44th Associate Justice of the Supreme Court of the Philippines. After the conclusion of World War II, he was selected to serve as a Justice of the Philippines on the International Military Tribunal for the Far East.

Biography
Jaranilla was born in La Paz, Iloilo City to Antonio Jerous Jaranilla and Juana Jebucion. In 1903, he was dispatched to the United States under the 'Pensionado' scholarship programme and studied at Santa Ana High School. He graduated from Georgetown University in 1907 with a diploma in law.

He died on June 4, 1980 at age 96.

In popular culture
Jaranilla was portrayed by Bert Matias in the NHK miniseries Tokyo Trial (2016).

References

Judges of the International Military Tribunal for the Far East
1883 births
1980 deaths
People from Iloilo City
Secretaries of Justice of the Philippines
Secretaries of Agriculture of the Philippines
Secretaries of Trade and Industry of the Philippines
Osmeña administration cabinet members
Filipino judges of international courts and tribunals
Georgetown University Law Center alumni
University of Tennessee alumni
Associate Justices of the Supreme Court of the Philippines